Pignata may refer to:

 Pignata (pot) or pignatta, a clay cooking pot in Italian cuisine
 89664 Pignata, a minor planet
 Francesco Pignata (born 1978), Italian javelin thrower
 Tony Pignata, Australian football administrator

See also
 Piñata (disambiguation)